Arkadiusz Kaliszan  (born 13 November 1972 in Poznań) is a retired Polish professional footballer who played for Hutnik Kraków and Polonia Warsaw in the Polish Ekstraklasa. Kaliszan also made one appearance for the Poland national football team.

References

External links
 

1972 births
Living people
Footballers from Poznań
Polish footballers
Poland international footballers
Warta Poznań players
Polonia Warsaw players
Lech Poznań players
Widzew Łódź players
Korona Kielce players
Roda JC Kerkrade players
Hutnik Nowa Huta players
Expatriate footballers in the Netherlands
Association football defenders